Incontinence or Incontinent may refer to:

Fecal incontinence, the involuntary excretion of bowel contents
Urinary incontinence, the involuntary excretion of urine
 Lack of moderation or self-control, especially related to sexual desire - see Incontinence (philosophy)
Incontinent (album), a 1981 album by Fad Gadget

See also